Tales of Ordinary Madness is the debut solo studio album by Warren Haynes. The album was released in 1993, by Megaforce Records.

Track listing 
All songs were written by Warren Haynes except "Tattoos and Cigarettes" by The Crystal Zoo & Warren Haynes

Personnel
Warren Haynes - Guitar and Vocals
Chuck Leavell - Producer

References

1993 albums
Warren Haynes albums